Mitchell Waite is an American computer programmer, author and publisher of programming books and the mobile app iBird. Birding app first published by Mitch Waite Group in 2008: iBird Pro for the Apple iPhone His first book "Projects in Sight, Sound and Sensation" was published in 1974. He studied nuclear physics at Sonoma State University during 1971–1975.

His career began in 1977 when he met Steve Jobs at the Home Brew Computer Club at Stanford University. Jobs introduced the Apple I to the group and Waite was one of the first to purchase the single board personal computer at the Byte Shop in San Rafael. By this point Waite had published several computer books and was working on a book about computer graphics. Jobs found out about an elaborate weather station Waite had running on his houseboat in Greenbrae, California and attached to the Apple I, and invited himself up to see it. When Jobs arrived he spent the entire time bragging about the new Apple II he had developed with Steve Wozniak. It was 10X better than the Apple I he claimed and invited Waite to come to Cupertino to see it.

Waite met Jobs at the new offices of Apple Computer. Impressed with his books Jobs offered Waite a job as Apple's head of documentation, along with stock options. Waite accepted and asked if he could come in later in the morning since he lived in Marin county. Jobs told him that if he worked at Apple he had to be there 24 x 7. Waite balked, and told Jobs he could not live in Cupertino's asphalt jungle. Jobs was infuriated, called him a bozo and said he was blowing a once-in-a-lifetime opportunity. Waite told Jobs he felt he would be successful on his own one day as a writer or publisher but would still love to do something else to help Apple. Jobs told him to meet with Mike Markkula and Mike assigned Waite a job writing a magazine article comparing the Apple II to the Commodore 64 and learning the Commodore apart with a stiletto knife. After that Waite decided he was not destined to work in the computer industry but rather wanted to create new kinds of books and so he worked even harder at being a writer.

After writing 5 books on his own he began working with more of his friends in the hobby world. He enlisted his old College of Marin professors to help him write books about programming languages and soon has a reputation as one of the major shakers in the burgeoning computer book industry.

He established Mitch Waite Group at 1977, which has published more than 130 titles in the computer programming field. The company was later sold to Simon & Schuster. Waite also created the website WhatBird and later developed iBird, a bird field guide app for iOS and Android. iBird apps: http://www.ibird.com

Biography

Early life and education

Books 
Books written by Mitchell Waite include:

 CP/M Bible
 Soul of CP/M
 MS-DOS Bible
 C Primer Plus
 BASIC Programming Primer
 Unix Primer Plus
 Pascal Primer
 BASIC Programming Primer for PC
 Bluebook of Assembly Language
 DOS Primer for PC
 Pascal Primer
 Assembly Language Primer for PC
 Turbo C++ Bible
 The Unix Papers
 C: Step by Step
 Supercharging C with Assembly Language
 Inside the 80286
 Framework from the Ground Up
 Master C: Let the PC Teach You C
 Object Oriented Programming in Turbo C++
 C++ Primer Plus
 Master C++: Let the PC Teach You C
 Visual Basic How To
 Windows API Bible
 Workout C
 Windows Programming Primer Plus
 Windows API Bible
 Object Oriented Programming in Microsoft C++

Mitch Waite group 
iBird (various versions for iOS and Android)

References

American computer programmers
Living people
Sonoma State University alumni
People from Greenbrae, California
1946 births